William Haines may refer to:

William Haines (1900-1973) American movie actor who later became a designer of furniture and interiors
William Haines (artist)
William Haines (Australian politician) (1810–1866), Australian politician
William Haines (South Australian politician) (1831–1902), S.A. pioneer
William T. Haines, former governor of Maine
William Wister Haines, American novelist
Willie Haines (1900–1974), Portsmouth and Southampton footballer